Samuel Ruruarau Hiha (born 26 August 1997) is a field hockey player from New Zealand, who plays as a forward.

Personal life
Sam Hiha was born and raised in Napier, New Zealand.

Hiha is a graduate of Napier Boys' High School.

His grandmother Margaret Hiha, coach in 1983 Women's Hockey World Cup.

Career

Domestic competitions

Ford NHL
Sam Hiha was a member of the Central Mavericks in the Ford National Hockey League (NHL), representing the team from 2016 to 2019. During his time with the team, Hiha won bronze medal in the 2016 edition of the tournament.

Premier Hockey League
Following the overhaul of the NHL and subsequent introduction of the Premier Hockey League, Hiha was named in the Central Falcons. The league's inaugural edition was held in 2020, with the team taking home a gold medal.

National teams

Under-21
In 2016, Hiha made two appearances for the New Zealand U-21 team. His first was at the Sultan of Johor Cup in Johor Bahru, followed by the FIH Junior World Cup in Lucknow.

Two years later, in 2018, Hiha again represented the Under-21 team at the Sultan of Johor Cup.

Black Sticks
In 2020, Hiha was named in the Black Sticks squad for the first time, however due to the impact of the COVID-19 pandemic he made no international appearances.

Hiha was again named in the national squad in December 2020, for the 2021 Olympic year.

References

External links
 
 

1997 births
Living people
New Zealand male field hockey players
Male field hockey forwards
People from Napier, New Zealand
Field hockey players at the 2022 Commonwealth Games
2023 Men's FIH Hockey World Cup players
New Zealand Māori people